Park McArthur (born 1984, North Carolina, USA) is an artist living in New York City who works in sculpture, installation, text, and sound. McArthur is a wheelchair user whose work uses this position to inform her art.

Life and work
McArthur graduated with a Masters in Fine Art from the University of Miami in 2009 and studied at the Whitney Museum of American Art's Independent Study Program, 2011–2012. About McArthur's 2014 exhibition Ramps, wherein the artist exhibited the wheelchair ramps of institutions with which she had previously worked, writer Andrew Blackley said, "The exhibition displayed the means by which institutions both produce and deny access. Each ramp challenged reappraisal and reinforced a set of past and future foreclosures. ‘Ramps’ enlisted generative, generous responses to the negativity of the institution, to the point of engendering the reproduction of those very negative characteristics (by removing the objects’ previously assumed ‘function’). By extension, at stake and always under threat are the threaded relationships between queerness and disability, the breakdown of their concomitant binaries and the temporality of care."

In 2015, McArthur addressed Felix Gonzalez-Torrez's "Untitled" (Love Letter From the War Front) in Whitney Museum of American Art, Lower Manhattan, New York.

McArthur's work has been described as questioning of "care alongside questions of autonomy and dependency" in regards to the daily experience of disabled individuals. McArthur uses her work to challenge the status quo and give those who are usually marginalized by societal structures a voice. Her choice of medium are sculptures and installations that "conceptually driven and often composed of utilitarian materials such as blocks of foam or a Wikipedia entry." Her works elicit an “experience of activism and jerry-built ingenuity.”

In 2014, McArthur won the Wynn Newhouse Award, an annual prize given to disabled artists in recognition of their artistic merit.

In 2015, McArthur was an Artadia Awardee.

McArthur is represented by Essex Street Gallery in New York.

Notable solo exhibitions
 "Projects 195: Park MacArthur", MoMA, New York, New York (2018)
"New Work: Park MacArthur", SFMOMA, San Francisco (2017)
"Poly", Chisenhale Gallery, London (2016)
 Yale Union, Portland, Oregon (2014)
 "Passive Vibration Isolation", Lars Friedrich, Berlin, Germany (2014)
 "Ramps", Essex Street, New York, New York (2014)

Selected group exhibitions
 "2017 Whitney Biennial," Whitney Museum of American Art, New York (2017)
 "Incerteza viva: 32nd Bienal de São Paulo", São Paulo, Brazil (2016)
 "Greater New York", MoMA PS1, Long Island City, New York (2015)

References

External links
 Essex Street Gallery
 Jennifer Burris, "Park McArthur", Bomb Magazine, 2014
 Park McArthur, 99 Objects: "Untitled" (Love Letter From The War Front), 1988 by Félix Gonzalez-Torres, Whitney Museum of American Art, 2015
 Michele Robecchi, "Park McArthur 'Poly' at Chisenhale Gallery, London", Mousse Magazine, 2016
 Projects 195: Park McArthur, The Museum of Modern Art, 2019
 Colby Chamberlain, "On the Art of Park McArthur", Artforum, 2020

Living people
1984 births
21st-century American artists
Artists with disabilities
American people with disabilities
21st-century American women artists
Artists from North Carolina